

This is a list of the National Register of Historic Places listings in Haakon County, South Dakota.

This is intended to be a complete list of the properties on the National Register of Historic Places in Haakon County, South Dakota, United States. The locations of National Register properties for which the latitude and longitude coordinates are included below, may be seen in a map.

There are three properties listed on the National Register in the county. Another property was once listed but has been removed.

Current listing

|}

Former listing

|}

References

 
Haakon County